Victor Alexandrovich Otiev (February 24, 1935, in Vladikavkaz, Northern Osetia, USSR – June 7, 1999, in Saint Petersburg, Russian Federation) was a Soviet, Russian painter, graphic artist, lived and worked in Leningrad, regarded as one of representatives of the Leningrad school of painting.

Biography 
In 1955 he went to Leningrad and entered at the painting department of the Leningrad Institute of Painting, Sculpture and Architecture named after Ilya Repin, where he was a student of Boris Ugarov, Andrei Mylnikov, Nikita Medovikov and Vladislav Anisovich.

In 1961 Otiev graduated from the Leningrad Institute of Painting, Sculpture and Architecture in Victor Oreshnikov's workshop. His graduation work was genre painting named "A Herdsman".

Since 1950, Otiev participated in art exhibitions. He painted landscapes, portraits, genre paintings, scenes with horses, sketches from the life. One of the leading themes of his art – an equestrian sport. His personal exhibition was in Leningrad in 1980. Otiev was a member of the Saint Petersburg Union of Artists (before 1992 – the Leningrad branch of Union of Artists of Russian Federation) since 1967.

Otiev died on June 7, 1999, in Saint Petersburg. Paintings by Otiev reside in art museums and private collections in Russia, France, England, the United States, Japan, Italy, and other countries.

References

Bibliography 
 Sergei V. Ivanov. Unknown Socialist Realism. The Leningrad School. - Saint Petersburg: NP-Print Edition, 2007. – pp. 186, 192, 367, 395–397, 400, 404–406, 417, 418, 420, 422, 423. , .
 Anniversary Directory graduates of Saint Petersburg State Academic Institute of Painting, Sculpture, and Architecture named after Ilya Repin, Russian Academy of Arts. 1915 - 2005. - Saint Petersburg: Pervotsvet Publishing House, 2007. p. 87.

1935 births
1999 deaths
20th-century Russian painters
Russian male painters
Soviet painters
Socialist realist artists
Leningrad School artists
Repin Institute of Arts alumni
Members of the Leningrad Union of Artists
20th-century Russian male artists